Parco regionale del Delta del Po may refer to:

 Parco regionale del Delta del Po, Emilia-Romagna: the park along the Po Delta in Emilia-Romagna;
 Parco regionale del Delta del Po, Veneto (Italiano): the park along the Po Delta in Veneto.

Not to be confused with Po Delta Interregional Park, which is the sum of the two, still to be established.

Parks in Emilia-Romagna
Parks in Veneto
Regional parks of Italy